Leonid Mikhailovich Roshal (born April 27, 1933 in Livny) is a noted pediatrician from Moscow, Russia, expert for the World Health Organization, and chairman of International Charity Fund to Help Children in Disasters and Wars.

Biography
Roshal was born in the village of Livny, Oryol Oblast, Russian SFSR, Soviet Union. His mother, Emma, came from a Jewish family in what is today Ukraine. His father, Mikhail, was a fighter jet pilot.

Roshal has been leading the Emergency Surgery & Children's Trauma Department of Moscow's Pediatric Scientific Research Institute since 1981. In 2003, he also took over the Moscow Institute of Emergency Children's Surgery & Traumatology, which is currently treating 60,000 children a year.

Roshal negotiated with Chechen terrorists during the Moscow theater hostage crisis in 2002. He also served as a negotiator in the 2004 Beslan school hostage crisis, working for the release of children and trying to convince the hostage-takers to allow the hostages to have food and water. After the events in the Beslan crisis played out, he also served as the advisor to the medical teams that had to treat burn wounds on hundreds of children.

Since 2005 he is a member of the Public Chamber of Russia. He is also a member of the Presidential Commission on Human Rights.

Views
Roshal publicly spoke out against the war in Chechnya and the arrest of Mikhail Khodorkovsky. In February 2006 he criticized the Mothers of Beslan for "judging the state rather than the terrorists" at a trial of one of the Beslan hostage takers.

Roshal is a supporter of Vladimir Putin and his policies. Since 2013, he has been a member of the central headquarters of the All-Russia People's Front, a right-wing political coalition led by Putin. In 2020, Russian opposition leader Alexei Navalny's wife, Yulia Navalnaya, characterized Roshal as "little more than a stooge" for Putin. On February 25, 2023, the European Union imposed sanctions against Roshal due to his co-chairmanship of the All-Russia People's Front, which provides support for Russia's war against Ukraine, and his personal statements in support of the military action against Ukraine.

Roshal is outspoken anti-gay. In 2013, during press conference answering the question about his views on the Russian gay propaganda law discussed by the Russian parliament back then he said "I'll be short: I hate gays and everything about it".

Awards
 2018 - Ahmadiyya Muslim Peace Prize for the year 2017

References

External links

Businessweek "2005 Stars of Europe" Article
The last witness.  What doctor Roshal's insult was to Mothers of Beslan, Novye Izvestia, February 13, 2006.  Machine-translated by www.online-translator.com.  Last accessed August 5, 2006.

1933 births
Beslan school siege
Russian Jews
Living people
Russian pediatricians
Moscow theater hostage crisis
Soviet pediatricians
Members of the Civic Chamber of the Russian Federation
Recipients of the Ahmadiyya Muslim Peace Prize